Craftsman may refer to:

A profession
Artisan, a skilled manual worker who makes items that may be functional or strictly decorative
Master craftsman, an artisan who has achieved such a standard that he may establish his own workshop and take on apprentices
Tradesman, a worker specialising in an occupation that requires work experience, on-the-job training or vocational education, but not a degree and is not necessarily restricted to manual work
Craftsman, a military rank within the Royal Electrical and Mechanical Engineers, equivalent to a private

Arts, media, and entertainment
American Craftsman, an American domestic architectural and interior design style inspired by the Arts and Crafts movement
Craftsman (album), a 1995 album by Guy Clark
The Craftsman (book), a 2008 book by Richard Sennett
The Craftsman (newspaper), an 18th-century British newspaper 
The Craftsman (magazine), a 20th-century American magazine of furniture and architectural style begun by Gustav Stickley
Craftsman Magazine, a magazine published in the UK from 1983 to 2007
The Craftsman (TV), a documentary about Blue Ox Millworks on the Magnolia Network / Discovery Plus Channel

Brands and companies
Craftsman (tools), a brand of tools, lawn and garden equipment, and work wear formerly controlled by Sears Holdings, now owned by Black and Decker, Inc.
Craftsman Book Company, publisher of technical references for construction professionals
Craftsman furniture, the Arts and Crafts Movement style furniture of Gustav Stickley's Craftsman Workshops

See also
Craft, the profession of a craftsman
Craft production, the manufacturing process 
Craftsman Truck Series, the sponsor name of the NASCAR Camping World Truck Series from 1996 through 2008
Demiurge, or rational craftsman, a philosophical concept for an artisan-like figure responsible for the fashioning and maintenance of the physical universe
Handicraft, the product of a craftsman
Craftsmanship, the degree of quality exhibited by a handicraft (or a measure of how well-made or intricate the handicraft is)